The 2020–21 Liga Alef season is the 12th season as third tier since its re-alignment in 2009 and the 54th season of third-tier football in Israel.

Changes from last season

Team changes
 Hapoel Iksal and Hapoel Kfar Shalem were promoted to Liga Leumit; Hapoel Ashkelon and Hapoel Bnei Lod (both to South division) were relegated from Liga Leumit.
 Since the previous season was abandoned due to the COVID-19 pandemic, no team was relegated to Liga Bet. However Ironi Kiryat Gat and Hapoel Asi Gilboa folded and didn't register to this season.
 Maccabi Tzur Shalom and Maccabi Ironi Kiryat Ata merged in July 2020.
 Ihud Bnei Majd al-Krum, Hapoel Bu'eine, Hapoel Bnei Fureidis, Maccabi Bnei Reineh, Tzeirei Tayibe (to the North division), F.C. Dimona and Ironi Kuseife (to the South Division) were promoted from Liga Bet to complete a 34 team line-up, 18 teams in each division.

Format change
To accommodate the shortened schedule caused by COVID-19 pandemic, the league was split into two phases. For the first phase each division was split to two sub-divisions with nine teams in each sub-division, to be played as a double round robin tournament (16 matches in total). At the end of the first phase in each division the two top teams from each sub-division qualifying to a promotion group of four teams, again to be played as a double round robin tournament (6 matches in total), with the winning team gaining promotion to Liga Leumit and the second-placed team qualifying to the promotion play-offs.
The seven bottom placed teams in each sub-division would continue in their respective sub-division with the points gained during the first phase, playing an additional round robin schedule (six matches in total). The bottom team in each sub-division would be relegated to Liga Bet and the sixth placed team would compete to the relegation play-offs.

North Division

Sub-division A

Sub-division B

Promotion group

South Division

Sub-division A

Sub-division B

Promotion group

Promotion play-offs
In the first round of the play-offs the two second-placed teams from the promotion groups faced each other in a single match on neutral ground. The winner of the match faced the 14th-placed team from Liga Leumit in a single match.

First round

Second round

Maccabi Kabilio Jaffa was not promoted to Liga Leumit.

Relegation play-offs
In each division (North and South) the sixth-placed teams from each sub-division played each other, with the winning team staying in Liga Alef. The losing team from each division faced the Liga Bet play-off winner in a single match for a place in Liga Alef.

North division

First round

Second round

Ironi Tiberias was not relegated to Liga Bet.

South division

First round

Second round

Nordia Jerusalem was not relegated to Liga Bet.

References

3
Liga Alef seasons
Israel Liga Alef